"Homer's Triple Bypass" is the eleventh episode of the fourth season of the American animated television series The Simpsons. It originally aired on the Fox network in the United States on December 17, 1992. In this episode, Homer suffers a heart attack due to his very poor health and diet. Dr. Hibbert tells Homer that he needs a triple bypass, but the Simpson family resorts to discount surgeon Dr. Nick after learning how expensive the operation would be in a regular hospital.

The episode was written by Gary Apple and Michael Carrington and directed by David Silverman.

Plot
One evening while eating dinner in bed, Homer seems to be having heart problems but is not concerned. The next morning, Marge makes him oatmeal for breakfast but he rejects it in favor of bacon and eggs, despite the chest pains he has just been feeling. Driving to work, he hears an irregular thumping noise, and is relieved when a gas station mechanic tells him it is his heart, not his car. 

At work, Mr. Burns observes Homer eating and sleeping at his post. He fires him, and berates his gross incompetence. At this, Homer has a heart attack. Dr. Hibbert informs him and Marge that he needs coronary artery bypass surgery, which will cost $30,000. Hearing this, Homer has another heart attack, and the fee rises to $40,000. This is far beyond the Simpsons' means. Homer manages to obtain an insurance policy, but has another heart attack as he is signing the contract, which causes it to be immediately revoked. He then approaches leaders of various religious communities, hoping for help, without success.

Finally, he decides to be treated by Dr. Nick Riviera, who will perform any operation for $129.95. The doctor rents a tape to learn how to perform this operation, but something else has been recorded over important parts of the tape. In the operating theater he does not know where to start, but Lisa, who has been reading up on the subject, calls down instructions from her place in the viewing gallery. The operation is a complete success.

Production

The idea for "Homer's Triple Bypass" came from James L. Brooks, who pitched the idea of Homer having a heart attack. However, the writers disagreed with such a heavy topic. The episode was not written by a member of the show's regular staff, but was instead scripted by freelance writers Gary Apple and Michael Carrington, who were hired by Brooks due to the show suffering from a depleted writing team after the third season ended, and because the remaining members did not bother to do the episode. Carrington would provide voice work for later episodes, such as "I Love Lisa" (as Sideshow Raheem), "Homer and Apu" (as a comedian), and "Simpson Tide" (as Homer's drill instructor). Apple and Carrington decided to have a scene where Lisa and Bart visit Homer before his surgery and were unsure of how to do it, so they approached Brooks, who made up the entire scene on the spot. Originally, the surgery was supposed to be performed by Dr. Hibbert, but it was later changed to Dr. Nick. In the original airing of the episode, Dr. Nick's phone number was the number of a real legal clinic, whose lawyers made them change it to 1-600-DOCTORB.

The episode's production staff decided that David Silverman would be able to make the episode funny, so he was selected to direct it. He went "all out" and did his best to make Homer's grimaces as humorous as possible, to keep the episode at least somewhat lighter in tone. Silverman added some special touches: for example, when Homer has an out of body experience, his foot was still touching his body to signify that he was not dead. A doctor acted as a medical consultant for the episode.

The episode was to have concluded with Homer eating a pizza in his hospital bed following the operation, and with Marge asking a nurse where the pizza had come from. This reflects the earlier flashback scene where Grampa Simpson watches Homer as an infant, chewing on a slice of pizza in the hospital. Out of concern that it was making light of the unhealthy lifestyle that had caused the infarction, the episode instead concluded with the family visiting Homer while he is recuperating in intensive care.

Cultural references
The opening sequence of the episode is a parody of American television show COPS; it was not in the original animatic and added later because the episode was too short to fit in its required 22-minute length. When Homer is performing a sock-puppet show to Lisa and Bart, he uses Akbar and Jeff, both of whom are characters from Matt Groening's weekly comic strip Life in Hell. Homer follows behind the house that was the birthplace of Edgar Allan Poe, which was placed in the episode by David Silverman. During this scene Homer starts to hear a heartbeat, a reference to Poe's "The Telltale Heart". The scene where Homer sings in a church as a boy is based on the film Empire of the Sun. Bart refers to being a part of the MTV Generation who "neither feel high nor low." When Homer tries to allay his children's concern over his forthcoming heart operation by telling them only bad people die, Bart then asks about Abraham Lincoln, to which Homer incorrectly tells him that he sold poisoned milk to schoolchildren, which is a reference to Abraham Lincoln's mother Nancy who died of milk sickness, an illness that is caused by drinking the milk of cows that have eaten the poisonous herb white snakeroot.

Reception
In its original broadcast, "Homer's Triple Bypass" finished 16th in ratings for the week of December 14–20, 1992, with a Nielsen rating of 14.3, equivalent to approximately 13.2 million viewing households. It was the highest-rated show on the Fox network that week, beating Married... with Children.

Warren Martyn and Adrian Wood, authors of I Can't Believe It's a Bigger and Better Updated Unofficial Simpsons Guide, called it "a cautionary tale that gives Dr Nick his biggest chance to shine." They also praised the "cloud goes up, cloud goes down" line. IGN noted that the episode "introduced fans to one of the show's more endearing background players, Dr. Nick." Krusty's line "this ain't make-up" is one of Matt Groening's favorite lines from the show.

References

External links

The Simpsons (season 4) episodes
1992 American television episodes
Television episodes about diseases and disorders

fi:Simpsonit (4. tuotantokausi)#Pumppu pettää (Homer's Triple Bypass)